Shangxinjie Station is an interchange station on Line 6 and Loop Line of Chongqing Rail Transit in Chongqing municipality, China, which is located in Nan'an District. It opened in 2014.

Station structure

References

Nan'an District
Railway stations in Chongqing
Railway stations in China opened in 2014
Chongqing Rail Transit stations